Lionel Froissart is a French sports journalist. He was born in 1958 in Paris. He worked for Libération for almost thirty years, where he specialized in F1 and tennis. He is known for his biography of Ayrton Senna, published in 2004. The 2007 novel Les boxeurs finissent mal… en général won the 2008 Sport-Scriptum prize for the best sports book of the year. Punto Basta, his new novel appeared in 2021.

After the 2022 Austrian Grand Prix he was fired after Criticising Aston Martin F1 Team driver Lance Stroll as "The Autistic".

References

French sports journalists
1958 births
Living people
French male novelists
French male journalists
20th-century French journalists
20th-century French male writers
21st-century French journalists
21st-century French novelists
21st-century French male writers
Journalists from Paris